Anthony Cioffi (born August 26, 1994) is an American football safety and linebacker who is currently a free agent. He most recently played for the BC Lions of the Canadian Football League (CFL). He played college football for Rutgers University, where he was a four-year starter, as a cornerback his freshman and sophomore years, as a free safety his junior year, and as a strong safety in his senior season. He was signed by the Oakland Raiders as an undrafted free agent in 2017. He spent two years on the CFL’s Ottawa Redblacks before signing a futures/reserves contract with the New York Jets of the National Football League. In January 2021, Cioffi signed with the BC Lions.

Early years
Anthony’s parents, Jerry and Josephine Cioffi own a deli in his hometown of Springfield, NJ. His mother is an Italian teacher at Florence M. Gaudineer Middle School while his father and other family members runs the deli, Cioffi's Deli and Pizza. Known for his exceptional speed, Sports Illustrated noted in an April 2017 feature that "...Cioffi and BYU’s Micah Hannemann were the only white corners to start for a BCS school recently. Cioffi had earned his way into that coveted corner spot after a stellar high school career at Jonathan Dayton in Springfield, New Jersey and by winning the 2012 Group 1 state title in the 100 meters with a time of 10.86. Cioffi defeated the favorite in that state title race, Anthony Averett, who is now a cornerback for the Baltimore Ravens. He graduated high school with a 2.3 GPA"

Professional career

Oakland Raiders 
Cioffi signed with the Oakland Raiders as an undrafted free agent on May 5, 2017. He was waived on September 2, 2017.

Ottawa Redblacks
On April 19, 2018, Cioffi signed with the Ottawa Redblacks of the Canadian Football League (CFL).

New York Jets
On February 13, 2020, Cioffi was signed to a two-year deal by the New York Jets. He was waived on August 15, 2020, but re-signed a week later. He was waived again on August 25, 2020.

BC Lions
On January 13, 2021, it was announced that Cioffi had signed a one-year contract with the BC Lions. He played in 10 regular season games where he had 23 defensive tackles, one interception, and one forced fumble. He was released prior to free agency on January 11, 2022.

Tampa Bay Bandits
On February 23, 2022 on the second day of the 2022 USFL Draft, the Tampa Bay Bandits picked Cioffi with the 5th pick of the 19th round.

Cioffi and all other Tampa Bay Bandits players were all transferred to the Memphis Showboats after it was announced that the Bandits were taking a hiatus and that the Showboats were joining the league.

On January 21, 2023, Cioffi was released by the Showboats.

References

External links
 
 BC Lions bio
 Rutgers profile

1994 births
Living people
American football safeties
BC Lions players
Canadian football defensive backs
Jonathan Dayton High School alumni
Oakland Raiders players
Ottawa Redblacks players
Rutgers Scarlet Knights football players
People from Springfield Township, Union County, New Jersey
Sportspeople from Union County, New Jersey
Players of American football from New Jersey
Players of Canadian football from New Jersey
New York Jets players
Tampa Bay Bandits (2022) players